Dirty Looks may refer to:

 Dirty Looks (album), a 1983 album by Juice Newton
 Dirty Looks (band), an American rock band from San Francisco, California
Dirty Looks (non-profit), a queer film collective in New York City and Los Angeles, California
 Dirty Looks (New York band), an American rock band from Staten Island, New York
 "Dirty Looks" (song), a 1987 song by Diana Ross
 "Dirty Looks", a song by Electric Six from the album I Shall Exterminate Everything Around Me That Restricts Me from Being the Master